This is a list of the songs that reached number one in Mexico in 1975, according to Núcleo Radio Mil as published in the Billboard and Notitas Musicales magazines.

Chart history (Billboard)

Chart history (Record World)

See also
1975 in music

References

Sources
Print editions of the Billboard and Record World magazines.

1975 in Mexico
Mexico
Lists of number-one songs in Mexico